Errol Gulden (born 18 July 2002) is an Australian rules footballer who plays for the Sydney Swans in the Australian Football League (AFL). He was recruited by the Sydney Swans with the 32nd draft pick in the 2020 AFL draft.

Early life
Gulden was born in Sydney, New South Wales to a Turkish-born father and an Australian mother. He began playing junior Australian rules football for the Maroubra Saints as a child and joined the Sydney Swans academy at 11 years of age. In 2018 Gulden was named as an Under 16s All-Australian after his stellar season with the NSW/ACT Under-16s Rams, and was also named as the team's most valuable player. He played in the 2019 NAB All Stars futures Match alongside future teammate Braeden Campbell and Logan Mcdonald. Gulden also played for the UNSW-Eastern Suburbs Bulldogs in three seasons from 2018 to 2020 for a total of 33 games and was named as best on ground in their 2019 premiership win over Sydney University.

AFL career
In his first game, he kicked 3 goals and collected 19 disposals and earned himself a Rising Star nomination for the round. In addition, Gulden polled two votes in the 2021 Brownlow Medal, becoming the fifth Swan to poll votes on debut. After this performance, Champion Data statistics described him as having two of the best games recorded by a debutant ever.
Gulden played the first eight games of the 2021 season, before being sidelined for an extended period of time due to stress reactions in his foot. He returned in Round 15 against Port Adelaide and remained in the side for the rest of the year. Gulden became a key part of Sydney's best 22, helping the team qualify for finals after a 16th-placed finish the year before. He played 15 games and kicked 12 goals, and was recognised by his peers when he won the AFLPA Best First Year Player award. He also polled in the top 5 for the Rising Star, and was the highest-polling first-year player.

Statistics
Updated to the end of the 2022 season.

|-
| 2021 ||  || 21
| 18 || 14 || 11 || 195 || 87 || 282 || 82 || 52 || 0.8 || 0.6 || 10.8 || 4.8 || 15.7 || 4.6 || 2.9 || 2
|-
| 2022 ||  || 21
| 25 || 18 || 8 || 338 || 142 || 480 || 112 || 89 || 0.7 || 0.3 || 13.5 || 5.7 || 19.2 || 4.5 || 3.6 || 3
|- class=sortbottom
! colspan=3 | Career
! 43 !! 32 !! 19 !! 533 !! 229 !! 762 !! 194 !! 141 !! 0.7 !! 0.4 !! 12.4 !! 5.3 !! 17.7 !! 4.5 !! 3.3 !! 5
|}

Honours and achievements
Individual
 AFLPA Best First Year Player Award: 2021
 AFL Rising Star nominee: 2021 (round 1)

References

External links

2002 births
Living people
Sydney Swans players
Australian rules footballers from New South Wales
Australian people of Turkish descent